Anna Dammann (19 Sept 1912 in Hamburg – 30 Sept 1993 in Munich) was a German stage and film actress. She was married to Walter Geese.

Selected filmography
 Sergeant Schwenke (1935)
 The Journey to Tilsit (1939)
 Midsummer Night's Fire (1939)
 St. John's Fire (1939)
 My Life for Ireland (1941)
 Die Troerinnen des Euripides (1959)
 Nacht ohne Abshied (1943)

References

Bibliography
 Hull, David Stewart. Film in the Third Reich: A Study of the German Cinema, 1933-1945. University of California Press, 1969.

External links

1912 births
1993 deaths
German film actresses
German stage actresses
Actresses from Hamburg